This is a list of awards given to Desmond Tutu.

References 

Tutu, Desmond
Tutu, Desmond